Buno Bedele (also Buno Bedelle) is one of the zones of the Oromia Region in Ethiopia. Located in western Oromia, Buno Bedele is bordered on the south by Southern Nations, Nationalities, and Peoples Region, on the west by the Ilu Aba Bora Zone, on the north by the East Wollega Zone  and West Wollega Zone and on the east by the Jimma Zone. Its administrative center is Bedele.

The Buno Bedele was created by 9 districts and 1 town in March 2016. The Zone covers 5,856.5030 square kilometres of which 1,126.64 square kilometres are covered by forests.

Demographics
Based on the 2007 Census conducted by the Central Statistical Agency of Ethiopia, this Zone has a total population 829,663.

References

Oromia Region
Zones of Ethiopia